The Kazinga Channel in Uganda is a wide,  long natural channel that links Lake Edward and Lake George, and a dominant feature of Queen Elizabeth National Park. The channel attracts a varied range of animals and birds, with one of the world's largest concentration of hippos and numerous Nile crocodiles.

Lake George is a small lake with an average depth of only  and which is fed by streams from the Rwenzori mountains. Its outflow is through the Kazinga Channel which drains into Lake Edward, water levels fluctuating very little.

In 2005, large numbers of hippos were killed in the channel as a result of an anthrax outbreak, which occurs when animals eat remnants of vegetation in the driest months, absorbing bacterial spores that can live for decades in dry soil.

The channel is described as a popular wildlife tourism area.

External links 

 Anthrax Kills 18 Hippos in Ugandan National Park 
 Strolling Guides - Kazinga Channel Some photographs and information.

References 

Rivers of Uganda
Lake Edward
Lake George (Uganda)
Kasese District